Joshua or Josh Smith may refer to:

Art
Josh Smith (artist) (born 1976), American artist based in New York
Joshua Smith (artist) (1905–1995), Australian artist

Sports

Association football (soccer)
Josh Smith (footballer, born 1986), Australian rules footballer for North Melbourne, West Perth and East Perth
Josh Smith (footballer, born 1994), Australian rules footballer for Collingwood and West Coast Eagles
Josh Smith (soccer) (born 1982), American soccer midfielder
Joshua Smith (soccer) (born 1992), American soccer center back

Baseball
Josh Smith (left-handed pitcher) (born 1989), American professional baseball pitcher
Josh Smith (right-handed pitcher) (born 1987), American professional baseball pitcher
Josh Smith (infielder) (born 1997), American professional baseball shortstop

Other sports
Josh Smith (born 1985), American  professional basketball forward
Josh Smith (athlete)
Josh Smith (rugby league) (born 1979), Australian rugby league footballer of the 2000s
Joshua Smith (basketball) (born 1992), American professional basketball center
Joshua Smith (cricketer) (born 1992), English cricketer

Music
Josh Smith (musician) (1984) Blues guitar player from Connecticut
 Josh Smith (born 1983), American musician, bassist for Halestorm
Joshua Caleb Smith or Joshua C.S. (born 1984), American musician, singer, and songwriter
 Josh Smith, American lead singer for Ashes Remain

Politics
Joshua Smith (English politician) (1732–1819), English politician, Member of Parliament for Devizes 1788–1818
Joshua Smith (New York politician) (1763–1845), New York politician, father of Joshua B. Smith
Joshua B. Smith (1801–1860), New York politician, son of the above

Other
Joshua Smith (minister) (1760–1795), American hymn compiler and Baptist minister
Joshua Bowen Smith (1813–1879), American abolitionist and Underground Railroad conductor
Joshua Fredric Smith (born  1981), American actor from Northern California
Joshua I. Smith (born 1941), American businessman; chairman and managing partner of the Coaching Group, LLC
Joshua R. Smith (born 1968), American computer scientist
Joshua Toulmin Smith (1816–1869), British political theorist, lawyer and local historian of Birmingham